Wij, Heren van Zichem (We, Gentlemen of Zichem) was a Flemish TV drama series, originally broadcast between 1969 and 1972 in 26 episodes on the BRT (nowadays the VRT). The program was based on several novels by Ernest Claes, who died just a few months before the show first aired. All episodes were shot in the Flemish village Zichem. At the time it was one of the most popular TV series in Flanders, attracting almost 2,960,000 viewers which is about 3/4 of all Flemish people. Tourism to the village boomed, while it hardly had enough bars, let alone restaurants to accommodate the tourists. In a 2004 interview with Het Nieuwsblad actor Fons Exelmans (who played the Witte) remembered that tourists were often confused because certain houses and buildings were located less close to each other than in the series. The actors were also invited to appear during annual festivities as promotional stunts.<ref>{{Cite web|url=http://www.nieuwsblad.be/cnt/nbra08102003_042|title=Nog altijd met Zichem verbonden}}</ref>Wij, Heren Van Zichem has been repeated several times since. The show was also broadcast on Dutch television.

In 1971 it won Humo's Prijs van de Kijker ("Humo's Viewers' Award").

An audio play record based on the series was released on vinyl in 1970.

Cast
 Pastoor Munte: Luc Philips
 Moeder Cent: Jenny Tanghe
 De Witte: Fons Exelmans
 Jef de smid: Robert Marcel
 Vrouw Coene: Dora van der Groen
 Boer Coene: Bob Storm
 Herman Coene: Jo De Meyere
 Wannes Raps: Gaston Vandermeulen
 Elza van Berckelaer: Denise Zimmerman
 Rozelien: Martha Dewachter
 Clementine: Jenny Van Santvoort
 Meneerke Parmentier: Frans Vandenbrande
 Fien Janssens: Ann Petersen
 Frans Hofkens: Walter Moeremans
 Gabrielle: Rita Lommée
 Liza Mettes: Greta Verniers
 Notaris Dutry: Jacques Aubertin
 Schoolmeester Baekelandt: Michel Vanattenhoven
 Victalis van Gille: Miel Vanattenhoven
 Fons Coene: Jacky Morel
 Broos Aspelagh: Walter Cornelis
 Geert Boonejan: Ray Verhaeghe
 Bet Kek: Jan Reussens
 Dries: Lode Van Beek
 Dokter Volders: Piet Bergers
 Sepke: Bernard Verheyden
 Niske: Roger Bolders
 Peerke Grune: Jan Muës
 Koster Fideel: Maurits Goossens

In popular culture

The TV series was referenced twice in the Belgian comics series The Adventures of Nero. Meneer Pheip says in the album "Magelaan 2" (1971) that he prefers watching Wij, Heren van Zichem, while the Maasai doctor Zongo in "Zongo in the Kongo" (1971) also happens to own a TV set in the middle of the jungle where he watches Wij, Heren van Zichem''.

Sources

External links
 

Flemish television shows
Belgian drama television shows
1969 Belgian television series debuts
1972 Belgian television series endings
Comedy-drama television series
Period family drama television series
Costume drama television series
Television shows based on novels
Television series set in the 19th century
Television shows set in Belgium
Belgium in fiction
Films based on works by Ernest Claes
Black-and-white Belgian television shows
Eén original programming